The Bridgewater Bridge is a road and rail bridge that carries the Midland Highway and South Railway Line across the Derwent River in Hobart, Tasmania, Australia. The steel truss vertical lift bridge and specially-built causeway connect the Hobart suburbs of Bridgewater and Granton. The bridge was completed in 1946 and accommodates a two-lane highway, a single track railway and a grade-separated footpath.

The bridge is the major connector of the Midland Highway on the eastern shore and the Brooker Highway on the western shore. The bridge is the oldest surviving lift span bridge in Australia; lifting of the bridge can cause considerable traffic delays.

History
The Bridgewater Bridge was one of the first bridges constructed in Tasmania following British settlement in 1803, and gave its name to the nearby suburb of Bridgewater. Lieutenant-Governor George Arthur commissioned the construction of the bridge and causeway as part of the Launceston Hobart Trunk Road, linking both Tasmanian towns and providing easier access to farmlands in the interior of Tasmania.

The causeway
Construction commenced on the bridge in 1829. Operations were supervised by Roderic O'Connor. The causeway, which was constructed first, was built by a workforce of 200 convicts who had been sentenced to secondary punishment. These convicts, using nothing but wheelbarrows, shovels and picks and muscle power, shifted  of soil, stones and clay. The finished causeway stretched , although did not span the full width of the Derwent. The original plan apparently called for a viaduct, but this plan was abandoned and the half-built arches were filled in to form the present causeway.

The first bridges
Upon completion of the causeway, a punt operated across the deep, navigable section of the river, but could not cope with traffic demands. To resolve this issue, the first bridge across this point of the Derwent opened in 1849. The bridge was designed by the firm of architect and former convict James Blackburn. Being a sliding bridge, it could slide back to allow shipping to pass through. In the late 1870s, the Tasmanian Main Line Railway called for modifications to the causeway so they could lay tracks over it. The causeway required widening and the sliding bridge was now replaced by a swing bridge.

On 22 July 1886, a train from the north was passing over the bridge when the engine left the tracks and tipped over, hanging precariously above the water on the edge of the southern end of the swing bridge. Two people, fireman William Shaw and passenger Daniel Turner, died as a result of the accident. The driver was injured. The locomotive was salvageable. The cause of the accident was found to be that the rails failed to match properly when the bridge was closed, so the bridge was modified again to solve this problem. The bridge lasted several decades more before being replaced by two swing bridges in the early 1900s, one for the railway, and one for the road traffic. The pivot and the sandstone abutments of the railway bridge are still standing and can be viewed on the left of the present bridge as one travels towards the north.

Both the first and second swing bridges did not run straight off the end of the causeway; rather, they turned slightly to the right. The second swing bridge was left standing when the present lifting bridge was being constructed to prevent traffic stoppages, so the present bridge deviates from the causeway quite appreciably.

The current lift bridge

Construction on the present steel vertical lift bridge across the Derwent began in 1939. Construction was interrupted by World War II; the bridge opened to road traffic in March 1942, with completion of the lifting segment finally completed in early 1946.  The bridge opened to rail traffic in late 1946. It consists of a long concrete bridge that leads off the end of the causeway, and a steel lifting section just before the northern bank of the river. The lifting section is one of only a few remaining in the Southern Hemisphere, and is the largest of its kind remaining in Australia. The bridge was designed to last a century without replacement. A small control house stands on the lifting section. Inside are the switches and locks which operate the bridge.

Until 1984, the Australian Newsprint Mills at Boyer moved all its produce by river. Barges were used to transport paper from the mill to the storage sheds at Pavilion Point at Hobart, and for this reason the bridge was required to open very frequently. Consequently, a bridge-keeper lived on-site and opened and closed the bridge when required. However, when the decision was made to cease river transportation, an on-site keeper was no longer necessary, so although the bridge can and does still open, bridge openings are now infrequent.

In response to vandalism of the house which contains the bridge operating controls, closed-circuit television cameras were installed along the lifting span sometime between 2003 and 2005.

On 30 October 2006 a fault was found in one of the steel cables holding up the two  concrete counterweights above the road, forcing the temporary closure of the bridge. This closure caused peak hour traffic delays, mainly along the East Derwent Highway, due to traffic being diverted over the Bowen and Tasman bridges. The cables, which were put in place in 1994, were supposed to have a 20-year lifespan, and as they have lasted barely over half that time. Rail services ceased using the bridge when the South Line was cut back to terminate at the Brighton Transport Hub in June 2014.

Engineering heritage
The bridge received an Engineering Heritage Marker from Engineers Australia as part of its Engineering Heritage Recognition Program.

Replacement bridge

Between 2001 and 2005, the Australian Government set aside $100 million towards the replacement of the Bridgewater Bridge, soon after the Tasmanian Government decided to build the replacement to the south of the existing bridge. However, after years of inaction the State government has encountered some heritage issues with replacing the bridge and is to be replaced as part of the final stage of the Brighton Bypass and Midland Highway upgrade.

Towards the end of 2010, the State government released plans for a new Derwent River crossing, next to the current bridge. The new bridge, when complete, will carry the Midland Highway and the old bridge will be left open for rail, pedestrian and local traffic. While the Bridgewater Bridge is recognised as being limited in its ability to perform the function of the Midland Highway, it also has important heritage values and is recognised as a landmark in the area.

From 2006 until 2010, the lifting segment of the Bridgewater Bridge was out of commission, due to failed maintenance. The State Government spent $14 million to refurbish the bridge and provide it with a further 15 years of life, until a replacement can be built. This refurbishment replaced the vandalised control house and its controls and all of the cabling to raise and lower the bridge.

In March 2016, Infrastructure Tasmania published its review of a design and cost estimate for the construction of a replacement structure for the existing Bridgewater Bridge, which considered various options for a replacement structure and provided advice as to the most feasible crossing solution. As part of the 2018-19 federal budget, the Australian Government announced a $461 million grant towards the construction of a new Bridgewater Bridge, representing 80 per cent of the expected total construction cost. The Tasmanian Government is expected to contribute $115 million. Construction was expected to commence in 2019; however, following independent assessment of the project by Infrastructure Australia in July 2019, the evaluation identified a range of issues, which may add to costs and require further work to address, and recommended that the Tasmanian Government revise its business case. The project is scheduled to start design and approvals in 2019, with the design to be agreed by the end of 2020. Substantive construction is expected to commence in 2022 and completion is targeted in 2024.

References

External links

State Library of Tasmania Images, historic pictures of the Bridgewater Bridge and Causeway
RailTasmania, modern picture of the Bridgewater Bridge and Causeway

Bridges completed in 1946
Bridges in Hobart
Railway bridges in Tasmania
Recipients of Engineers Australia engineering heritage markers
Road bridges in Tasmania
Road-rail bridges in Australia
Steel bridges in Australia
Tasmanian Heritage Register
Vertical lift bridges in Australia
1946 establishments in Australia